Richard James Gleeson (born 2 December 1987) is an English cricketer, who plays for Lancashire in domestic cricket. He made his international debut for the England cricket team in July 2022.

Career
He made his first-class debut for Northamptonshire against the Australians on 15 August 2015 and his List A debut for Northamptonshire against Lancashire on 8 June 2016 in the Royal London One-Day Cup. 

Initially, Gleeson played for Northants on a match-by-match basis while continuing his full-time job coaching in schools and cricket clubs on behalf of the Lancashire Cricket Board, but in July 2016 he signed a three-year contract with Northants. He signed to play Twenty20 cricket for the Rangpur Riders in the 2016 Bangladesh Premier League. He moved from Northamptonshire to Lancashire towards the end of the 2018 season.

On being named in England's training squad in May 2020, and the possibility of playing for England, Gleeson said "never give up, keep following your dream and keep pursuing things". On 9 July 2020, Gleeson was included in England's 24-man squad to start training behind closed doors for the One Day International (ODI) series against Ireland, and was later named as one of three reserve players in England's squad for the series.

On 29 May 2022, in the 2022 T20 Blast, Gleeson took his first five-wicket haul in Twenty20 cricket, with 5/33 against the Worcestershire Rapids.

In July 2022, Gleeson was named in England's Twenty20 International (T20I) squad for their home series against India. He made his T20I debut on 9 July 2022, for England against India, taking the wickets of Rohit Sharma, Virat Kohli and Rishabh Pant, finishing with figures of 3/15.

References

External links
 

1987 births
Living people
English cricketers
England Twenty20 International cricketers
Northamptonshire cricketers
Lancashire cricketers
Sportspeople from Blackpool
North v South cricketers
Marylebone Cricket Club cricketers
Cumberland cricketers
Melbourne Renegades cricketers
Manchester Originals cricketers